Sara Raasch (born August 26, 1989) is an American author of young adult fiction. She wrote the fantasy New York Times Bestselling trilogy Snow Like Ashes (Balzer + Bray/HarperCollins) as well as the fantasy series These Rebel Waves and the sequel, These Divided Shores (Balzer + Bray/HarperCollins).

Biography 

Raised in Ohio, Raasch graduated from Wright State University with a degree in Organizational Leadership and currently resides in Ohio.

Works 

Snow Like Ashes series (Balzer + Bray/HarperCollins)
 Snow Like Ashes (2014)
 Ice Like Fire (2015)
 Frost Like Night (2016)
  These Rebel Waves (2019)
  These Divided Shores (2019)
  Set Fire to the Gods (co-author) (2020)
These Rebel Waves  and its sequel, These Divided Shores were "inspired by the Spanish Inquisition and the Golden Age of Piracy".

Reception 

Snow Like Ashes (2014) became a New York Times Bestseller in 2015. Shortly after, Ice Like Fire (2015) debuted on the New York Times list at #3. Raasch's books have been Colorado Blue Spruce Award nominees, an RT Book Reviews Top Pick, a Huffington Post Best Overall YA Book of 2014, and a Hypable Top Ten Books of 2014.

References

External links 

 Official website
 Tumblr
 Twitter
 Facebook
 Pinterest
 Goodreads
 YouTube

American young adult novelists
Living people
1989 births
American women novelists
21st-century American women